The Meihua Lake or Plum Blossom Lake is a lake in Dongshan Township, Yilan County, Taiwan.

Name
Meihua means plum blossom because of its resemblance to a plum flower with five petals.

History
The lake was originally named Dapi Lake. In 1970s, President Chiang Ching-kuo visited the area and was impressed by its beauty, hence naming it Meihua Lake.

Geography
There is a small island sits at the center of the lake with a suspension bridge connecting to the circular trail. The lake also has a cycling trail around its perimeter.

See also
 Geography of Taiwan

References

Lakes of Yilan County, Taiwan